Bullet is a 1984 Indian Malayalam film, directed by Crossbelt Mani and produced by Royal Pictures. The film stars Ratheesh, Balan K Nair, Bheeman Raghu and Kuthiravattam Pappu in lead roles. The musical score is by Guna Singh.

Cast
Ratheesh
Balan K Nair
Bheeman Raghu
Kuthiravattam Pappu
Silk Smitha
Swapna
Vettoor Purushan

References

External links
 

1984 films
1980s Malayalam-language films